{{Infobox comics creator

| image         = ABN.jpg
| imagesize     = 
| caption       = 
| alt           = 
| birth_name    = Anders Brekhus Nilsen
| birth_date    = 
| birth_place   =
| death_date    = 
| death_place   = 
| nationality   = American
| cartoonist    = y
| write         = 
| art           = 
| pencil        = 
| ink           = 
| alias         = 
| signature     = 
| notable works = Big QuestionsDon't Go Where I Can't Follow'Dogs and Water| awards        = 
| website       = http://www.andersbrekhusnilsen.com
}}
Anders Nilsen (born 1973) is an American cartoonist who lives in Los Angeles, California.

 Biography 
Nilsen graduated with an art degree from the University of New Mexico in 1996. He moved to Chicago in 1999 to get a Master of Fine Arts in painting, but dropped out after one year.

Nilsen's comics have appeared in the anthologies Kramers Ergot and Mome. His graphic novel Dogs and Water won an Ignatz Award in 2005. An excerpt from  Dogs and Water  was featured in the inaugural 2006 edition of the Best American Comics anthology, and the book was expanded and reissued in hardcover in 2007. In 2007, Nilsen won an Ignatz Award for his graphic memoir, Don't Go Where I Can't Follow, and in 2012, he won an Ignatz Award for Big Questions, a collected edition of his comic book series.

Nilsen is co-founder of Autoptic, a bi-annual festival of independent comics and art culture that takes place in Minneapolis. He is also one of the organizers of comics residency Pierre Feuille Ciseaux at the Angoulême International Comics Festival. Nilsen has been regularly holding lectures and workshops at various organizations, including Chulalongkorn University in Bangkok, Forecast program in Berlin, Center for the Humanities at the University of Wisconsin, Center for Cartoon Studies, and Stanford University.

 Awards 
 2001: Xeric Award for The Ballad of the Two-Headed Boy 2005: Ignatz Award for Dogs and Water 2007: Ignatz Award for Don't Go Where I Can't Follow 2012: Ignatz Award for Big Questions 2012: Lynd Ward Graphic Novel Prize for Big QuestionsSelected works
 Dogs and Water, Drawn & Quarterly, October 2004, 
 Monologues for the Coming Plague, Fantagraphics, 2006, 
 Don’t Go Where I Can’t Follow, Drawn & Quarterly, 2006 (reissued 2012), 
 The End, Fantagraphics, Coconino Press, January 2007, 
 Monologues for Calculating the Destiny of Black Holes, Fantagraphics, January 2009, 
 Big Questions, Drawn & Quarterly, June 2011, 
 Rage of Poseidon, Drawn & Quarterly, October 2013, 
 God and the Devil at War in the Garden, May 2015, Self Published
 Poetry is Useless, Drawn & Quarterly, September 2015, 
 A Walk in Eden, Drawn & Quarterly, October 2016, 
 Tongues Chapter 1-4, No Miracles Press In Your Next Life You Will Be Together With All of Your Friends'', No Miracles Press, March 2021,

References

External links 
 
Original Art by Anders Nilsen

Interviews 
'Anders Nilsen Interview' in 'Lines and Marks'
'Anders Nilsen: drawing through grief' in The Guardian
'Massive, Eccentric, Ambitious: Anders Nilsen' in Publishers Weekly
'Dead Birds, Big Questions' in The Comics Journal
'An interview with Anders Nilsen' in The Nashville Review
'Anders Nilsen: The Interview' on Metabunker
Anders Brekhus Nilsen interview on Barbarus

Notable Reviews 
 'Fate, Feathers, and Death' in ""The New York Times""

American bloggers
Alternative cartoonists
Artists from Minneapolis
Living people
1973 births